Sts. Cyril and Methody is a Macedonian Orthodox church located in Blasdell, New York, just outside of Buffalo. The church serves a community of approximately 4,000 Macedonian-Americans within Western New York as well as portions of Western Pennsylvania (shared by the St. Nicholas Parish in Green, OH). It is the host to the oldest Macedonian Orthodox Church festival every second weekend of July, beginning in 1991.

History
The church was founded for the Macedonians seeking refuge from socialist Yugoslavia in the mid to late 1960s, many of whom would work for the local steel industry including a large influence by Bethlehem Steel in neighboring Lackawanna. By 1969, land was purchased to begin building a place of worship for the community. Due to a lack of available funding among parishioners, a church hall was constructed instead of a church. The church itself followed in 1975 on the 24th of May, which was declared by the diocese on July 7. On September 13, 1981, all portions of the project were finally completed. It was not before 2001 that the church saw major renovations, with the addition of a smoking hall (smaller than the main hall) and an overhaul of the existing church hall and church structure as approved by the church board. 2001 also saw the appointment of a new pastor, Dimitar Alincanec, with the first and extremely popular pastor Trajko Boseovski appointed to fill the vacancy at St. Clement of Ohrid in Toronto, Ontario, Canada. Father Trajko is still a regular to the annual festival.  In 2005, a new roof was installed to accommodate the church hall renovations. Petko Kesakovski was appointed as the third pastor of the church in June 2006, though his relocation led to another change as the fourth pastor, Andreja Damjanovski was assigned in December 2008. 2010 saw the addition of bronze cupolas as well as an upgrade of the exterior shed, whose main purpose is to serve as the festival food tent but also provides an adjacent patio for event bookings. Amid changing of pastors in 2019, the parish was the host of the annual diocesan meetings and convention, after which pastor Miki Miovski became the fifth priest to preside over the church.

Festival
The annual ethnic festival held on the church grounds has attracted guests from all over North America. It began in 1991 and was the first held by any of the Macedonian-Orthodox diocesan churches in New York state (a year before St Dimitrija Rochester and four before St Gjorgi Syracuse). There is live entertainment, including a Macedonian band and dance group. The live entertainment can be found in the main events tent along with the alcohol distributors. On the opposite side of the rear end of the lot is the food tent with the games tent between the two. Inside the smoking hall, the seating is rearranged to accommodate the baked goods area. The main hallway has become an impromptu museum of Macedonian history.

References

Macedonian Orthodox churches in the United States
Eastern Orthodox churches in New York (state)
1969 establishments in New York (state)